Citharichthys gymnorhinus, the anglefin whiff, is a species of flatfish in the large-tooth flounder family Paralichthyidae. It is a demersal marine fish that inhabits the mid to outer continental shelf of the western Atlantic Ocean, in both tropical and subtropical waters. It ranges from the Bahamas and Florida in the north to Guyana and Nicaragua in the south, though larvae samples have also been collected off the coast of Canada.

Like the rest of the large-tooth flounders, it has both eyes on the left side of its head. As a result, it is of no commercial importance. It is similar in size and appearance to Citharichthys cornutus and it shares the same habitat.

References

Citharichthys
Fish of the Caribbean
Fish of Suriname
Fish of Guyana
Fish described in 1970